Junonia rhadama, the brilliant blue, is a butterfly in the family Nymphalidae. It is found on Madagascar, Mauritius, Rodrigues, Réunion, the Comoros, and the Seychelles (Astove Island). The habitat consists of transformed grasslands and Anthropogenic biomeanthropogenic environments.

The larvae feed on Barleria species.

References

rhad
Butterflies of Africa
Butterflies described in 1833